Marc Rosset defeated Roger Federer 2–6, 6–3, 7–6(7–5) to win the 2000 Open 13 singles competition. Fabrice Santoro was the defending champion. This was the first ATP Tour final of Roger Federer's career.

Seeds

  Yevgeny Kafelnikov (second round)
  Thomas Enqvist (second round)
  Dominik Hrbatý (first round)
  Sébastien Grosjean (semifinals)
  Marat Safin (first round)
  Fabrice Santoro (semifinals)
  Thomas Johansson (second round)
  Arnaud Clément (second round)

Draw

Finals

Top half

Bottom half

External links
 2000 Open 13 Singles draw

Open 13
Open 13